The province of La Union has 576 barangays comprising its 19 municipalities and 1 city.

Barangays

References

Populated places in La Union
La Union